This is a list of labels owned by Concord.

Concord
Concord Records
Concord Jazz
Heads Up International
Telarc International Corporation
Fearless Records
Razor & Tie
Washington Square
Rounder Records
Loma Vista Recordings
Sugar Hill Records
Zoë Records
Craft Recordings
Craft Latino
Fania Records
Milestone Records
Musart Records
Prestige Records
Stax Records
Varèse Sarabande
Vee-Jay Records
Wind-up Records
Fantasy Records
Vanguard Records
Kidz Bop
Music For Little People
Victory Records

Defunct/dormant labels
Feinery Records
Flying Fish Records
Galaxy Records
Bandit Records
HighTone Records
Kicking Mule Records
Playboy Jazz Records
Reality Records
Rockingale Records
The Jazz Alliance Records
Vee-Jay Records
Volt Records
Concord Picante
Hear Music
Monterey Jazz Festival Records
Peak Records
Specialty Records
Telarc International Corporation
Heads Up International
Concord Concerto
Stretch Records
Sugar Hill Records
Takoma Records
The Bicycle Music Company
Vanguard Records
Wind-Up Records
Contemporary Records
Debut Records
Good Time Jazz Records
Nitro Records
Milestone Records
Original Blues Classics
Original Jazz Classics
Pablo Records
Prestige Records
Riverside Records
Fania Records
Independiente
Delicious Vinyl

 01
Concord Music Group labels
Concord Music Group labels